Maimaicheng, was Chinese toponym meaning (literally) "trade town" or "trading post". Maimaichengs were found in border posts and towns of Outer Mongolia from the 18th to early 20th centuries. Maimaicheng may refer to:

 Altanbulag, Selenge
 Amgalan town, (until the early 20th century), today in Bayanzürkh District of Ulan Bator
 part of medieval Khovd (city)